Impatiens hawkeri, the New Guinea impatiens, is a species of flowering plant in the family Balsaminaceae. It is native to Papua New Guinea and the Solomon Islands. It has been bred and hybridized in cultivation to produce a line of garden plants.

It was first collected in the Territory of Papua in 1884 and soon became popular as a greenhouse plant. After its discovery, fifteen other similar New Guinea taxa were collected, all of which were later determined to be forms of I. hawkeri.

Plants with a great variety of flower and leaf colours are sold in nurseries. The species has been crossed with Impatiens aurantiaca and I. platypetala to improve characteristics such as drought resistance.

References

hawkeri
Flora of New Guinea
Flora of the Solomon Islands (archipelago)
House plants
Plants described in 1886